Maria Gładkowska (born 16 September 1957) is a Polish film, stage, and television actress. She gained critical acclaim in the 1980s that culminated in her Zbigniew Cybulski Award (1988). Gładkowska portrayed Daisy, Princess of Pless, her breakthrough performance in Magnat (1987), which was included in the list of 100 Best Polish Films of all time.

Career

Early life and education 
Gładkowska started her film career in 1977 at the age of 20. In her senior year of high school, she won a national contest for a theatre review and appeared in Janusz Morgenstern's historical series Polish Roads (Polish: Polskie drogi). Later she attended the Aleksander Zelwerowicz National Academy of Dramatic Art's Faculty of Acting, where she studied between 1978 and 1982. Her first professional stage appearance was as Elwira in a production of Husband and wife (Polish: Mąż i żona) by Aleksander Fredro (1983).

Theatre 
She was a guest troupe member of the Adequate Theatre (Polish: Teatr Adekwatny) in Warsaw, "Scena Prezentacje" Theatre in Warsaw, and a permanent troupe member of the Siren Theatre (Polish: Teatr Syrena) in Warsaw and the New Theatre in Łódź (Polish: Teatr Nowy). 

Her most notable stage appearances are as Mother in The Laments (2001), as Mary Tyron in Long Day's Journey into Night (2006), as Susie Cameron in The Spirit Level (2011) opposite Andrzej Szczytko, as Alice in Sexy Laundry (2018) opposite Wojciech Wysocki, and as Anne Hathaway in Shakespeare's Will (2019).

Since 2017 Gładkowska performs at the New Theatre, Łódź and Izrael Poznański Palace, narrating the Łódź's edition of Anna Dymna's Cracow Poetry Salon (Polish: Krakowski Salon Poezji).

Film and television 
Gładkowska had great success in films such as Dekalog: One (1988, dir. Krzysztof Kieślowski), The Hostage of Europe (1989, dir. Jerzy Kawalerowicz), Faustina (1995, dir. Jerzy Łukaszewicz) opposite Dorota Sega, Argument About Basia (1995) opposite Piotr Fronczewski, Historia kina w Popielawach (1998, dir. Jan Jakub Kolski), Chopin: Desire for Love (2002, dir. Jerzy Antczak) and King Arthur (2004, dir. Antoine Fuqua). She reclaimed her stardom in the late 1990s and early 2000s with supporting roles in soap opera Mothers, Wives and Lovers (Polish: Matki, żony i kochanki) and medical drama For better and for worse (Polish: Na dobre i na złe).

Gładkowska was the Polish voice of Shmi Skywalker in Star Wars: Episode I – The Phantom Menace (1999) and Star Wars: Episode II – Attack of the Clones (2002).

Additionally, Gładkowska has appeared in many Television Theatre (Polish: Teatr Telewizji) plays including Irydion (1982, dir. Jan Englert) as Elsionoe, The Misanthrope (1984, dir. Janusz Majewski) as Éliante, The Mousetrap (1996, dir. Janusz Majewski) as Jennifer Brice and Pygmalion (1998, dir. Maciej Wojtyszko) as an Ambassador's wife.

Personal life 
Gładkowska has been married three times, with each marriage ending in divorce. Later, Gładkowska began a relationship with a cinematographer and an Academy Award nominee Slawomir Idziak. She has three children, including Adam Wróblewski, known for his role in the Janusz Majewski's autobiographical film Mała matura 1947 (2010).

Filmography

Films 
 1982: Sęp (Dögkeselyű) as Cecília Roska
 1982: Wyjście awaryjne, jako Dorota, córka Kolędów
 1985: C.K. Dezerterzy, jako siostra
 1986: Magnat, jako Daisy
 1987: Cesarskie cięcie, jako Gabrysia, dziewczyna Marka
 1988: Dekalog I, jako Ania, koleżanka Krzysztofa
 1989: Vadon, jako Amadea Zsablyai
 1989: Bal na dworcu w Koluszkach, jako ambasadorowa
 1989: Wagarowicze (Iskolakerulok), jako Edit
 1989: Jeniec Europy, jako Madame Albine de Montholon
 1990: W środku Europy, jako matka Bogusia
 1991: Panny i wdowy, jako Ewelina
 1991: Tak tak, jako Krystyna
 1993: Dwa księżyce, jako Krystyna
 1994: Miasto prywatne, jako Gocha
 1994: Faustyna, jako lekarka
 1995: Barwy świętości, jako lektor
 1995: Awantura o Basię, jako Stanisława Olszańska
 1996: Słodko gorzki, jako matka „Mata”
 1998: Historia kina w Popielawach, jako dziedziczka
 2002: Chopin.Pragnienie miłości, jako księżna Joanna, żona Konstantego
 2004: Król Artur (King Arthur), jako matka Artura
 2005: Parę osób, mały czas, jako Marysia
 2007: Testosteron, jako matka Tytusa
 2009: Nigdy nie mów nigdy, jako kierowniczka schroniska dla zwierząt
 2009: Miasto z morza, jako Olga
 2010: Huśtawka, jako matka Anny
 2010: Milczenie jest złotem, jako szefowa
 2011: Być jak Kazimierz Deyna, jako teściowa
 2012: Vocuus, jako sędzia
 2012: Nad życie, jako matka Agaty Mróz
 2013: Śliwowica, jako Jagna Miedzianowska

TV series 
 1977: Polskie drogi, jako łączniczka
 1986: Biała wizytówka, jako Daisy
 1989: Kanclerz, jako księżniczka Radziwiłł
 1991: Pogranicze w ogniu, jako Renata von Nietzmer, sekretarka
 1991: Panny i wdowy, jako Ewelina, córka Karoliny
 1995, 1998: Matki, żony i kochanki, jako Maria, żona Liperta
 1996: Awantura o Basię, jako Stanisława Olszańska
 1997: Sława i chwała, jako księżna Maria Bilińska, siostra Myszyńskiego
 1999–2000: Czułość i kłamstwa, jako Ewa Miśkiewicz
 2002–2010: Samo Życie, jako prawnik
 2002: Lokatorzy, jako Agata Strakacz
 2005: Tak miało być, jako Elżbieta Zawilska, dyrektorka sanatorium
 2005: Pensjonat pod Różą, jako Gabi
 2005–2008, 2010, od 2012: Na dobre i na złe, jako Maria Starska, matka Leny
 2005: Biuro kryminalne, jako Małgorzata Matuszek
 2006–2012: Pierwsza miłość, jako Jagna Miedzianowska, mama Bartka
 2006: Niania, jako Wolska
 2006: Mrok, jako Kasia Orska
 2006: U fryzjera, jako klientka
 2007: Glina, jako Bożena Pawłowska, matka Kamila Króla
 2007: Mamuśki, jako Ela Malasińska, mama Jowitki
 2008: Daleko od noszy, jako redaktorka czasopisma „Przyszłość bez tajemnic”
 2009: Barwy szczęścia, jako matka Ady
 2009: Miasto z morza, jako Olga Wieniatycka
 2009: Sprawiedliwi, jako Jadwiga Kaniewska, żona profesora
 2011: Usta usta, jako urzędniczka USC
 2011: Ojciec Mateusz, jako doktor Barbara Woźniak, matka Radka
 2011: Rezydencja, jako Izabela Gruber, matka Kornelii
 2011: Unia serc, jako dyrektorka muzeum
 2012: Julia, jako Agata Miechowska
 2012: Prawo Agaty, jako sędzia Klimecka
 2014–2016: Klan, jako Wanda, nowa wybranka cukiernika Wiesława Orzeszki

Dubbing 
 1999: Gwiezdne wojny: część I – Mroczne widmo, jako Shmi Skywalker
 2002: Gwiezdne wojny: część II – Atak klonów, jako Shmi Skywalker i Dormé

References

Sources 
 Maria Gładkowska w bazie  filmpolski.pl
 Maria Gładkowska w bazie filmweb.pl
 Maria Gładkowska w bazie e-teatr.pl

External links 
 
 Maria Gładkowska na zdjęciach w bazie Filmoteki Narodowej „Fototeka”

Polish stage actresses
1957 births
Living people
People from Zielona Góra